La Chapelle-Erbrée is a commune in the Ille-et-Vilaine department of Brittany in north-western France.

Population
People from La Chapelle-Erbrée are called in French capellois, although the term is commonly applied to people from many other places with "Chapelle" in their names.

See also
Communes of the Ille-et-Vilaine department

References

External links

Mayors of Ille-et-Vilaine Association 

Communes of Ille-et-Vilaine